Echinodorus bracteatus is a species of plants in the  Alismataceae. It is native to Costa Rica, Nicaragua, Panama, Colombia and Ecuador.

Description
Leaves 20 – 80 cm long, long-petioled, blades cordate, at base lobate, at tip obtuse or shortly acuminate, 2/3 as broad as long, mostly about 30 cm, but sometimes more than 50 cm long. Pellucid markings in shape of points or short ovals, or absent.

Stem erect, 70 - 150 – 190 cm long, winged. Inflorescence paniculate, having usually 12 - 17 whorls. Bracts distinctly longer than the flowers, connate, 1.5 – 2 cm, exceptionally 6 cm long x 0.5 - 0.8 cm wide, having 25 - 30 ribs.

Flowers sessile or nearly so, having the pedicels only 1 – 2 mm long. Corolla white, usually 2.5 cm in diameter, stamens 20 - 24, anthers as long or broadly shorter as the filaments. Achenes claviform, short-beaked, with 4 - 5 facial ribs and usually 1 facial gland. Glands rarely 2 or absent.

Cultivation
One of the larger Amazon swords. Can grow too large for the average aquarium. Needs a large space, deep, rich substrate and plenty of light. According to reports, it flowers in the summer but doesn't set seed.

References

External links
 in German but good photographs
 herbarium specimen Guadeloupe 

bracteatus
Flora of Costa Rica
Flora of Nicaragua
Flora of Panama
Flora of Colombia
Flora of Ecuador
Freshwater plants
Plants described in 1881